Jeotgalicoccus nanhaiensis is a gram-positive bacterium. The cells of Jeotgalicoccus nanhaiensis are coccoid. Spores are not formed. It is not motile, which means that the species can not move under their own power itself.

References

External links
Type strain of Jeotgalicoccus nanhaiensis at BacDive -  the Bacterial Diversity Metadatabase

nanhaiensis
Bacteria described in 2004